The 2015 Island Games in Jersey was the fourteenth edition in which an association football tournament was played at the multi-games competition.

Participants

 (development squad)

Venues

Group Phase

Group A

Group B

Group C

Group D

Placement play-off matches

15th place match

13th place match

11th place match

9th place match

7th place match

5th place match

Final stage

Bracket

Semi-finals

Third place match

Final

Final rankings

See also
Women's Football at the 2015 Island Games
 Football at the 2015 Island Games

References

Men
2015